Korçë District, was one of the 36 districts of Albania, which were dissolved in July 2000 and replaced by 12 counties. Its capital was the city of Korçë. Its territory is now part of Korçë County: the municipalities of Korçë, Maliq and Pustec.

Korçë District was considered one of two main minority regions of the country's south.
During World War I the French created the Republic of Korça in the area.

Geography
It was situated in the southeastern part of Albania, from lat. 40°27'N to lat. 40°57'N and from long. 21°4'E to 20°19'E.

It was bordered by Pogradec District to the north, by Greece with the Florina regional unit (Greek Macedonia) to the east, Devoll District to the southeast, by Kolonjë District and Përmet District to the southwest, and by Gramsh District and Skrapar District on the west.

History

Antiquity

The Copper Age lasted from 3000 BC to 2100 BC. Mycenean pottery was introduced in the plain of Korçë during the late Bronze Age (Late Helladic IIIc), and has been claimed that the tribes living in this region before the Dark Age migrations, probably spoke a northwestern Greek dialect. The area was on the border between Illyria and Epirus and according to a historical reconstruction was ruled by an Illyrian dynasty until 650 BC, after which by a Chaonian dynasty. During this period the area was inhabited by Greek-speaking tribes, possibly Chaonians or Molossians, two of the  three major Epirotic tribes. Archaeologists have found a gravestone of the 2nd or 3rd century AD depicting two Illyrian blacksmiths working iron on an anvil near modern Korçë.

19th century  
Yuriy Venelin (1802–1839) a Russian scholar who specialised in Bulgarian studies noted that the Korçë District in 1833 (at which point its boundaries were quite different from the modern district, including all of Devoll and various other differences) had 50 villages with two thirds being Muslim and a third being Christian. Settlements of significance during that time were Moscopole, Vithkuq, Kamenicë, Floq, Boboshticë, Drenovë, Borje, Voskop and so on. Houses of the area numbered a total of 2400 containing some 22,000 people according to the Ottoman census. The Muslims and Christians of the region were noted as being "Albanians by nationality — speaking the same language, having the same customs" involved in agricultural employment, many unskilled and illiterate apart from those in Korçë and Moscopole that conduct trade. The villagers of Moscopole were mainly Aromanians in addition to Greeks and Albanians, while some Bulgarians living nearby.

20th century  
In the 1908 statistics of Amadore Virgili as presented by Nicholas Cassavetes for the Pan-Epirotic Union of Northern Epirus showed the entire kaza of Korçë, which also included surrounding rural areas as well as the modern Devoll District as having a Muslim majority which was not differentiated by nationality alongside a Christian minority of which there were 43,800 Albanian speakers and 1,214 Aromanians (Vlachs), with no Greek speakers found, while Bulgarians were not counted for. For the same area, the 1913 statistics of Destani, which did not differentiate subjects by faith but only language, found 89829 Albanian speakers, 3190 Aromanian speakers, 3985 Bulgarian speakers, no Greek speakers and 527 "others". With regard to the Aromanian population, Lambros Psomas argues the study of Virgili likely undercounted the Aromanian speakers while the study of Destani is more reliable with regard to the Aromanians but he also argues the study of Destani was pro-Albanian in motive and drastically undercounted the number of Greek speakers in the Himara and Leskovik kazas, while Psomas also excludes Korçë from the collection of regions with notable Greek-speaking presence. British historian Tom Winnifrith states that during the delineation of the Greek-Albanian border a part of the local pro-Greek element included communities whose native speech was Greek.

In 1919, US diplomat Joseph Emerson Haven on special detail in Albania wrote a detailed report regarding the political circumstances in the country. Haven wrote that the province of Korçë numbered some 60,000 people of whom 18% had a preference for union with Greece and within that group half were doing so from fear or from being promised financial gain through attainment of Muslim properties and land. Haven also noted that in 1919 there was a degree of antipathy shown by both Muslims and Christians in the district toward Greece, and an ethnic affinity among Albanians that, at the time, came before religious affinity. At the Peace Conference in Paris, the Greek delegation argued that all Christians in North Epirus, including those that spoke Albanian, should be classified as Greeks because, they argued, their sentiments were Greek, and they had a common religion with Greeks; Lambros Psomas, however, argued that this did not apply in Korçë kaza, where there were many Orthodox Albanian nationalists.

Demographics

Ethnicity 
Most of the population of the district of Korçë are ethnic Albanians, while a significant number of ethnic minorities (Aromanians) also inhabit the district. Aromanians are found residing in rural communities surrounding Korçë and number some 5,000 people, although other figures exist that inflate those numbers.

Greek speakers are found in the city of Korçë as well as in the surrounding region and especially in Korçë Plain.

A Slavic minority most concentrated in the municipality of Pustec also exists, as does a scattered presence of Romani people.

Religion 
The religious composition of the district of Korçë consists of Muslims and Orthodox Christians while the Muslims are divided between Sunni, Bektashi and Halveti groups. Additionally, among the Christians, there is a presence of Protestants, dating back to the actions of Gjerasim Qiriazi. Finally, a presence of Catholics was detected in the 2011 census.

Economy
During the 20th century, Korçë gained a substantial industrial capacity in addition to its historic role as a commercial and agricultural centre. The plateau on which the city stands is highly fertile and is one of Albania's main wheat-growing areas. Local industries include the manufacture of knitwear, rugs, textiles, flour-milling, brewing, and sugar-refining. Deposits of lignite coal are mined in the mountains nearby such as Mborje-Drenovë. The city is home to the nationally famous Birra Korça.

Administrative divisions
The district consisted of the following municipalities:

Drenovë
Gorë
Korçë
Lekas
Libonik
Maliq
Moglicë
Mollaj
Pirg
Pojan
Pustec (Liqenas)
Qendër Bulgarec
Vithkuq
Voskop
Voskopojë
Vreshtaz

Other communities and settlements

 Baban
 Bickë
 Boboshticë
 Burim
 Cerja
 Dardhë
 Diellas
 Drenovë
 Cangonj
 Ekmeçi
 Floq
 Gollomboç
 Goricë e Madhë
 Goricë e Vogël
 Kallamas
 Kamenicë
 Kapshticë
 Kozeli
 Kreshpanj
 Lajthizë
 Mançurisht
 Pilur
 Plasë
 Progër
 Pustec
 Rakickë
 Shtyllë
 Sinicë
 Voskopoja (Moscopole)
 Vreshtas
 Vranisht
 Zaroshkë
 Zemblak
 Zvedzë

Notable residents
Pellumb Kulla (born 1940), diplomat and author
Ibrahim Agha Father of Muhammad Ali Pasha

References

Districts of Albania
Geography of Korçë County